The Convict snake eel<ref>[http://www.fishbase.org/comnames/CommonNamesList.php?ID=17394&GenusName=Leiuranus&SpeciesName=versicolor&StockCode=15581 Common names for Leiuranus versicolor] at www.fishbase.org.</ref> (Leiuranus versicolor'') is an eel in the family Ophichthidae (worm/snake eels). It was described by John Richardson in 1848. It is a tropical, marine eel which is known from the Pacific Ocean, including Palau, Australia, Papua New Guinea, and Norfolk Island. It dwells at a depth range of 3–18 metres, and forms burrows in the soft bottoms of inshore regions. Males can reach a maximum total length of 75.4 centimetres.

References

External links
 

Ophichthidae
Fish described in 1848